James Michael Robbins (born September 3, 1989, in Raleigh, North Carolina) is a country music Award-winning American songwriter and producer.

Biography
In addition to having penned ten number-one singles, he won a CMA Triple Play Award in 2014 for having three #1 songs in a twelve-month period as well as winning the ASCAP country song of the year for Thomas Rhett's It Goes Like This. His songs "We Were Us", performed by Keith Urban and Miranda Lambert, won the Musical Event of the Year award at the 2014 CMA Awards, the CMA song of the year in 2020 for "The Bones" by Maren Morris and CMA Musical Event of The Year award for his cowritten and coproduced "Half Of My Hometown" by Kelsea Ballerini featuring Kenny Chesney
Robbins has produced songs for artists Keith Urban, Kelsea Ballerini, Canaan Smith, Carly Pearce Gnash, Chrissy Metz, Maddie and Tae, Mickey Guyton, Maren Morris, RaeLynn, Sabrina Carpenter, and Trent Harmon.

Since 2016 Robbins and his wife, Sarah Robbins, own and operate JRM Publishing, a boutique publishing company based out of Nashville with a roster of writers working in multiple genres. Current writers include Robbins, Eric Arjes, Derek Austin, Temecula Road, On The Outside and kyd the band.

Personal life
On April 16, 2016, Robbins married Sarah Boddie in Gulfport, Mississippi. Their daughter Lily was born in January 2018. Their son Ridge was born in December 2020.

Select songwriting discography
Songs written or co-written by Robbins.

Select production discography

Albums released as an artist
 Sleep The Pain Away (2005) LP
 Too Sorry For Apologies (May 9, 2006) EP
 See Through Secrets [Digital Release] (September 8, 2009) LP
 Step One EP (November 29, 2009) EP
 "Borrowed Time" (December 13, 2011) EP

References

http://theshotgunseat.com/songwriter-spotlight-jimmy-robbins/
http://radio.com/2014/03/18/keith-urban-miranda-lambert-we-were-us-behind-the-song/
http://www.ascap.com/playback/2014/10/action/10-breakout-artists.aspx

1989 births 
21st-century American singers
21st-century American male singers
American male singer-songwriters
American country songwriters
American pop rock singers
American rock songwriters 
Living people
Musicians from Raleigh, North Carolina
Singer-songwriters from North Carolina